Cicindela, a genus of tiger beetles, contains the following species:

 Cicindela abdominalis Fabricius, 1801
 Cicindela aberrans Fairmaire, 1871
 Cicindela aeneicollis (Bates, 1881)
 Cicindela africana (Cassola, 1983)
 Cicindela albissima Rumpp, 1962
 Cicindela albosinuata Olsoufieff, 1934
 Cicindela allardi (Cassola, 1983)
 Cicindela alluaudi W. Horn, 1911
 Cicindela altaica Eschscholtz, 1829
 Cicindela amargosae Dahl, 1939
 Cicindela ancocisconensis T.W. Harris, 1852
 Cicindela andrewesi (W. Horn, 1894)
 Cicindela angulicollis W. Horn, 1900
 Cicindela ankarahitrae (Jeannel, 1946)
 Cicindela anometallescens W. Horn, 1893
 Cicindela arenaria Fuessly, 1775

 Cicindela arenicola Rumpp, 1967
 Cicindela asiatica Audouin & Brulle, 1839
 Cicindela asperula L. Dufour, 1821
 Cicindela assamensis Parry, 1844
 Cicindela aterrima (Klug, 1834)
 Cicindela aurofasciata Dejean, 1831
 Cicindela aurora (Thomson, 1859)
 Cicindela aurulenta Fabricius, 1801
 Cicindela basilewskyana (Cassola, 1982)
 Cicindela batesi Fleutiaux, 1894
 Cicindela bellissima Leng, 1902
 Cicindela beneshi Varas Arangua, 1929
 Cicindela bianconii (Bertoloni, 1858)
 Cicindela bicolor Fabricius, 1781
 Cicindela bramani Dokhtouroff, 1882
 Cicindela brazzai Fleutiaux, 1893
 Cicindela calligramma Schaum, 1861
 Cicindela campestris Linnaeus, 1758
 Cicindela cardini (Leng & Mutchler, 1916)
 Cicindela carissima Fleutiaux, 1919
 Cicindela carlana Gestro, 1893
 Cicindela carolae Gage & McKown, 1991
 Cicindela carthagena (Dejean, 1831)
 Cicindela caternaulti Guerin-Meneville, 1849
 Cicindela cazieri Vogt, 1949
 Cicindela ceylonensis W. Horn, 1892
 Cicindela chinensis DeGeer, 1774

 Cicindela chrysippe (Bates, 1884)
 Cicindela cicindeloides (W. Horn, 1905)
 Cicindela cincta Olivier, 1790
 Cicindela clarina Bates, 1881
 Cicindela clavator (Jeannel, 1946)
 Cicindela clypeata Fischer von Waldheim, 1821
 Cicindela coerulea Pallas, 1773
 Cicindela columbica Hatch, 1938
 Cicindela compressicornis Boheman, 1860
 Cicindela congoensis Fleutiaux, 1893
 Cicindela convexoabrupticollis W. Horn, 1931
 Cicindela coquereli Fairmaire, 1867
 Cicindela corbetti W. Horn, 1899
 Cicindela craveri Thomson, 1856
 Cicindela cristipennis W. Horn, 1905
 Cicindela cubana (Leng & Mutchler, 1916)
 Cicindela cyanea Fabricius, 1787
 Cicindela cyaniventris (Chevrolat, 1834)
 Cicindela decemnotata Say, 1817
 Cicindela denikei Brown, 1934
 Cicindela denverensis Casey, 1897
 Cicindela depressula Casey, 1897
 Cicindela descarpentriesi (Deuve, 1987)
 Cicindela desertorum Dejean, 1825
 Cicindela desgodinsii Fairmaire, 1887
 Cicindela deyrollei Guerin-Meneville, 1849
 Cicindela didyma Dejean, 1825
 Cicindela diehli (Wiesner, 1997)
 Cicindela discrepans Walker, 1858
 Cicindela dispersesignata W. Horn, 1913
 Cicindela divergentemaculata W. Horn, 1913
 Cicindela diversa W. Horn, 1904
 Cicindela diversilabris (Cassola, 1996)
 Cicindela dives Gory, 1833
 Cicindela duodecimguttata Dejean, 1825
 Cicindela duplosetosa W. Horn, 1929
 Cicindela duponti Dejean, 1826
 Cicindela dysenterica (Bates, 1881)
 Cicindela elegantula Dokhtouroff, 1882
 Cicindela elisae Motschulsky, 1859
 Cicindela equestris Dejean, 1826
 Cicindela euthales Bates, 1882
 Cicindela fabriciana W. Horn, 1915
 Cicindela fatidica Guerin-Meneville, 1847
 Cicindela favergeri (Audouin & Brulle, 1839)
 Cicindela feisthamelii Guerin-Meneville, 1849
 Cicindela fera (Chevrolat, 1834)
 Cicindela ferriei Fleutiaux, 1895
 Cicindela fimbriata Dejean, 1831
 Cicindela flavomaculata Hope, 1831
 Cicindela flavosignata Laporte de Castelnau, 1835
 Cicindela flavovestita (Fairmaire, 1884)
 Cicindela fleutiauxi W. Horn, 1915
 Cicindela flexuosa Linnaeus, 1758

 Cicindela flohri (Bates, 1878)
 Cicindela foliicornis W. Horn, 1896
 Cicindela fontanea Werner, 2007
 Cicindela formosa Say, 1817
 Cicindela fulgida Say, 1823
 Cicindela gabonica Bates, 1878
 Cicindela galapagoensis (W. Horn, 1920)
 Cicindela gallica Brulle, 1834
 Cicindela gemmata Faldermann, 1835
 Cicindela gemmifera W. Horn, 1893
 Cicindela gigantula Schilder, 1953
 Cicindela goryi Chaudoir, 1852
 Cicindela gracileguttata (Mandl, 1966)
 Cicindela grandidieri Kunckel d’Herculais, 1887
 Cicindela grandis W. Horn, 1897
 Cicindela granulata Gebler, 1843
 Cicindela guerrerensis (Bates, 1890)
 Cicindela guttata Wiedemann, 1823
 Cicindela haefligeri W. Horn, 1905
 Cicindela hamiltoniana J. Thomson, 1857
 Cicindela harmandi Fleutiaux, 1893
 Cicindela herbacea Klug, 1832
 Cicindela heros Fabricius, 1801
 Cicindela hiekei (Cassola, 1982)
 Cicindela highlandensis (Choate, 1984)
 Cicindela hirticollis Say, 1817
 Cicindela hybrida Linnaeus, 1758
 Cicindela hydrophoba (Chevrolat, 1835)
 Cicindela iberica Mandl, 1935
 Cicindela intermedia Chaudoir, 1852
 Cicindela interrupta Fabricius, 1775
 Cicindela interruptoabbreviata W. Horn, 1921
 Cicindela interruptofasciata Schmidt-Goebel, 1846
 Cicindela isaloensis (J. Moravec, 2000)
 Cicindela ismenia Gory, 1833
 Cicindela japana Motschulsky, 1858
 Cicindela javetii Chaudoir, 1861
 Cicindela junkeri H.Kolbe, 1892
 Cicindela juno W. Horn, 1901
 Cicindela kachowskyi W. Horn, 1903
 Cicindela karlwerneri (J. Moravec, 1999)
 Cicindela kassaica (Rivalier, 1948)
 Cicindela kenyana (Cassola, 1995)
 Cicindela kerandeli Maindron, 1909
 Cicindela kikondjae (Cassola, 1982)
 Cicindela kolbeana W. Horn, 1915
 Cicindela lacrymans Schaum, 1863
 Cicindela lacteola Pallas, 1776
 Cicindela lagunensis Gautier des Cottes, 1872
 Cicindela lamburni (J. Moravec, 1999)
 Cicindela latesignata LeConte, 1851
 Cicindela laticornis W. Horn, 1900
 Cicindela laurae Gestro, 1893
 Cicindela lengi W. Horn, 1908
 Cicindela leptographa (Rivalier, 1965)
 Cicindela leucopicta Quedenfeldt, 1888
 Cicindela lewisii Bates, 1873
 Cicindela limbalis Klug, 1834
 Cicindela limbata Say, 1823
 Cicindela lisaannae (Gage, 1991)
 Cicindela lizleriana (Werner, 1997)
 Cicindela longestriata W. Horn, 1912
 Cicindela longicornis (W. Horn, 1913)
 Cicindela longilabris Say, 1824
 Cicindela lugubris Dejean, 1825
 Cicindela lurida Fabricius, 1781
 Cicindela lusitanica Mandl, 1935
 Cicindela macrochila (Rivalier, 1948)
 Cicindela macropus W. Horn, 1915
 Cicindela majalis Mandl, 1935
 Cicindela marginata Fabricius, 1775

 Cicindela marginella Dejean, 1826
 Cicindela marginipennis Dejean, 1831
 Cicindela mariae Gestro, 1893
 Cicindela maritima Dejean, 1822
 Cicindela maroccana Fabricius, 1801
 Cicindela marshalli Peringuey, 1896
 Cicindela mathani (W. Horn, 1897)
 Cicindela mechowi Quedenfeldt, 1883
 Cicindela mimula Peringuey, 1896
 Cicindela mireki (Werner, 2003)
 Cicindela miseranda W. Horn, 1893
 Cicindela monticola Menetries, 1832
 Cicindela moraveci (Sawada & Wiesner, 1999)
 Cicindela mouhoti Chaudoir, 1865
 Cicindela muata Harold, 1878
 Cicindela mufumbweana Cassola, Werner & Schule, 2009
 Cicindela mwinilungae Cassola, Werner & Schule, 2009
 Cicindela myinthlaingi (Wiesner, 2004)
 Cicindela nagaii (Sawada & Wiesner, 1999)
 Cicindela nebraskana Casey, 1909
 Cicindela neumanni H.Kolbe, 1894
 Cicindela nigrior Schaupp, 1884
 Cicindela nigritula W. Horn, 1915
 Cicindela nordmanni Chaudoir, 1848
 Cicindela nosei (Sawada & Wiesner, 2000)
 Cicindela notata Boheman, 1848
 Cicindela notopleuralis Acciavatti & Pearson, 1989
 Cicindela nubifera Quedenfeldt, 1883
 Cicindela nysa Guerin-Meneville, 1849
 Cicindela obsoleta (Say, 1823)
 Cicindela ocellata (Klug, 1834)
 Cicindela octogramma Chaudoir, 1852
 Cicindela octonotata Wiedemann, 1819
 Cicindela ohlone Freitag, Kavanaugh & Morgan, 1993
 Cicindela oregona LeConte, 1857
 Cicindela osa Alluaud, 1902
 Cicindela papillosa (Chaudoir, 1854)
 Cicindela parowana Wickham, 1905
 Cicindela patruela Dejean, 1825
 Cicindela permaculata (Basilewsky, 1971)
 Cicindela perroti Fairmaire, 1897
 Cicindela petermayri (Werner, 2003)
 Cicindela petiti Guerin-Meneville, 1849
 Cicindela pierroni Fairmaire, 1880
 Cicindela pimeriana Leconte, 1866
 Cicindela plutonica Casey, 1897
 Cicindela princeps Vigors, 1825
 Cicindela prodotiformis W. Horn, 1892
 Cicindela pseudoaurora (Johnson, 1998)
 Cicindela pseudoradians (Johnson, 1998)
 Cicindela pseudorusticana W. Horn, 1921
 Cicindela pseudosoa W. Horn, 1900
 Cicindela pseudosuturalis W. Horn, 1929
 Cicindela pseudotereticollis W. Horn, 1929
 Cicindela pseudoviridis W. Horn, 1914
 Cicindela pudibunda Boheman, 1860
 Cicindela pudica Boheman, 1848
 Cicindela pugetana Casey, 1914
 Cicindela pulchra Say, 1823
 Cicindela punctulata Olivier, 1790
 Cicindela purpurea Olivier, 1790
 Cicindela quadriguttata Wiedemann, 1821
 Cicindela quedenfeldti W. Horn, 1896
 Cicindela radians (Chevrolat, 1841)
 Cicindela regina H. Kolbe, 1885
 Cicindela repanda Dejean, 1825
 Cicindela resplendens Dokhtouroff, 1888
 Cicindela restricta Fischer von Waldheim, 1828
 Cicindela rhodoterena Tschitscherine, 1903
 Cicindela rivalieri (Basilewsky, 1958)
 Cicindela roseiventris (Chevrolat, 1834)
 Cicindela rufiventris (Dejean, 1825)
 Cicindela rufoaenea (W. Horn, 1915)
 Cicindela rufomarginata Boheman, 1848
 Cicindela rugicollis Fairmaire, 1871
 Cicindela rusticana Peringuey, 1892
 Cicindela sacchii (Cassola, 1978)
 Cicindela sachalinensis A.Morawitz, 1862
 Cicindela safraneki Werner & Wiesner, 2008
 Cicindela sahlbergii Fischer von Waldheim, 1824
 Cicindela sahy Alluaud, 1902
 Cicindela salvazai Fleautiaux, 1919
 Cicindela satura (Rivalier, 1965)
 Cicindela scabrosa Schaupp, 1884
 Cicindela schillhammeri (Wiesner, 2004)
 Cicindela sedecimpunctata (Klug, 1834)
 Cicindela segonzaci Bedel, 1903
 Cicindela semiconfluens (Rivalier, 1965)
 Cicindela senilis G. Horn, 1867
 Cicindela separata Fleutiaux, 1894
 Cicindela serieguttata W. Horn, 1934
 Cicindela setosomalaris W. Horn, 1913
 Cicindela sexguttata Fabricius, 1775
 Cicindela sexpunctata Fabricius, 1775
 Cicindela shinjii (Sawada & Wiesner, 2000)
 Cicindela shivah Parry, 1848
 Cicindela shozoi (Naviaux & Sawada, 1989)
 Cicindela sjoestedti W. Horn, 1927
 Cicindela smrzi (Werner, 2005)
 Cicindela soalalae Fairmaire, 1903
 Cicindela soluta Dejean, 1822
 Cicindela sommeri (Mannerheim, 1837)
 Cicindela songorica Motschulsky, 1845
 Cicindela splendida Hentz, 1830
 Cicindela suturata W. Horn, 1915
 Cicindela sylvatica Linnaeus, 1758
 Cicindela sylvicola Dejean, 1822: 51
 Cicindela talychensis Chaudoir, 1846
 Cicindela tenuicincta Schaupp, 1884
 Cicindela tenuisignata (LeConte, 1851)
 Cicindela tereticollis Boheman, 1860
 Cicindela thalestris (Bates, 1890)
 Cicindela theatina Rotger, 1944
 Cicindela trailini (Werner, 1999)
 Cicindela tranquebarica Herbst, 1806
 Cicindela transbalcalica Motschulsky, 1844
 Cicindela transversefasciata W. Horn, 1913
 Cicindela trifasciata (Fabricius, 1781)
 Cicindela trifasciata sigmoidea (LeConte, 1851)
 Cicindela tritoma Schmidt-Goebel, 1846
 Cicindela tuberculata
 Cicindela turkestanica Ballion, 1871
 Cicindela turkestanicoides W. Horn, 1938
 Cicindela varians Ljungh, 1799
 Cicindela vasseletii (Chevrolat, 1834)
 Cicindela velata Bates, 1872
 Cicindela veracruzensis (Johnson, 1998)
 Cicindela villosa Putzeys, 1880
 Cicindela virgula Fleutiaux, 1894
 Cicindela viridiflavescens (W. Horn, 1923)
 Cicindela viridipennis Schilder, 1953
 Cicindela vittata Fabricius, 1801
 Cicindela wachteli (Werner, 2003)
 Cicindela waynei Leffler, 2001
 Cicindela whithillii (Hope, 1838)
 Cicindela xanthophila W. Horn, 1894

References

Cicindela
 

no:Cicindela